Bergen Hospital Trust is one of the five health trusts owned by the Western Norway Regional Health Authority.

Institutions

It consists of 14 institutions, located all over Hordaland.

 Haukeland University Hospital
 Sandviken Hospital
 Voss Hospital
 Kysthospitalet i Hagevik
 Bjørgvin DPS
 Kronstad DPS
 Øyane DPS
 The Rehabilitation Centre on Nordås
 Askøy Addiction Treatment
 Tertnes Addiction Treatment
 Floen Addiction Treatment
 Skuteviken Addiction Treatment
 Klokkarvik Addiction Treatment
 Kanalveien Addiction Treatment

Health trusts of Norway
Companies based in Bergen
2002 establishments in Norway